The Ethiopian Revolution (12 January – 12 September 1974) was a period of civil, police and military upheaval in Ethiopia to protest against the weakened Haile Selassie government. It is generally thought to have begun on 12 January 1974 when Ethiopian soldiers began a rebellion in Negele Borana, with the protests continuing into February 1974. People from different occupations, starting from junior army officers, students and teachers, and taxi drivers joined a strike to demand human rights, social change, agrarian reforms, price controls, free schooling, and releasing political prisoners, and labor unions demanded a fixation of wages in accordance with price indexes, as well as pensions for workers, etc. 

In June 1974, a group of army officers established the Coordinating Committee of the Armed Forces, later branding itself as the Derg, which struggled to topple Haile Selassie cabinet under Prime Minister Endelkachew Makonnen. By September of that year, the Derg began detaining Endalkachew's closest advisors, dissolved the Crown Council and Imperial Court and disbanded the emperor's military staff. The Ethiopian Revolution ended with the 12 September coup d'état of Haile Selassie by the Coordinating Committee.

Background
The late 1960s in Ethiopia was marred with instability characterized by student movements against Emperor Haile Selassie starting from the December 1960 coup d'état attempt seeking liberal reforms including land reforms and land redistribution. Secondly, the Wollo and Tigray famines, ongoing since 1958, overshadowed the emperor's reputation, affecting the peasants. The government negligence in dealing with the famine was known by this point, and no relief effort report arrived via the Ministry of the Interior in November 1965 for 1965/6 famine in Were Illu, taking 302 days to reach the emperor.

For many centuries, the Ethiopian Empire had a semi-feudal mode of production, including land grabbing by the church (25%), the Emperor (20%), the feudal lords (30%) and the state (18%), leaving a mere 7% to the roughly 23 million Ethiopian peasants.  The landless peasants lost as much as 75% of their produce to the landlords, leaving them in a miserable life state. Haile Selassie had also promised to reform and modernize the country.

Events

The Ethiopian Revolution is widely considered to have begun on 12 January 1974 when a group of Ethiopian soldiers rebelled in Negele Borana. In February 1974 the military rulers of the Ethiopian Army, who were not ideologically united, comprised conservatives, moderates and radicals. In the process of socialist reforms, the radicals emerged victorious and wrested state power. 

The Coordinating Committee of the Armed Forces formed in June 1974, later called the Derg, which decided to seize power from the emperor while confronting the Prime Minister, Endelkachew Makonnen. Endelkachew was criticized for his backwardness in reforms which the Emperor, as the constitutional head, agreed to. On the Coordinating Committee's recommendation, Haile Selassie appointed him Chief of Staff of the Armed Forces in early July 1974.

September Revolution
Endalkachew resigned from office on 22 July and went to Djibouti; the Coordinating Committee took power by the end of the year. On 12 September, they arrested Haile Selassie, who remained at the National Palace until his death on 27 August 1975.

References

1974 in Ethiopia
Derg
20th century in Ethiopia
20th-century revolutions
Ethiopian Civil War
Haile Selassie
Rebellions in Ethiopia